Insides Out is a children's television game show. Its theme was the human body, and involved games that included body parts. A total of thirty episodes were made over two series, lasting from 15 September 1999 to 22 December 2000. It was presented by Mark Speight and Marsali Stewart, with co-presenter Otis the Aardvark.

References

1999 British television series debuts
2000 British television series endings
1990s British children's television series
2000s British children's television series
BBC children's television shows
British children's game shows
British television shows featuring puppetry
English-language television shows